Ernest Leslie Dickens (June 25, 1921 – September 27, 1985) was a Canadian two-sport athlete from Manitoba. He played soccer for Winnipeg United Weston and then enjoyed a career as an ice hockey defenceman in the National Hockey League (NHL) , playing with the Toronto Maple Leafs and Chicago Black Hawks between 1942 and 1951.

Career statistics

Regular season and playoffs

Awards and achievements
 Stanley Cup Championship (1942)
 AHL First All-Star Team (1947)
 Honoured Member of the Manitoba Hockey Hall of Fame

External links
 
Ernie Dickens's  biography at Manitoba Hockey Hall of Fame
Picture of Ernie Dickens Name on the 1942 Stanley Cup Plaque
Official Team Portrait of Ernie Dickens with the Toronto Maple Leafs
 

1921 births
1985 deaths
Calgary Stampeders (ice hockey) players
Canadian ice hockey defencemen
Canadian military personnel of World War II
Chicago Blackhawks players
Ontario Hockey Association Senior A League (1890–1979) players
Pittsburgh Hornets players
Providence Reds players
Ice hockey people from Winnipeg
Soccer players from Winnipeg
Stanley Cup champions
Toronto Maple Leafs players
Toronto Marlboros players
Winnipeg Falcon Rangers players
Winnipeg Monarchs players